Wen-mei Hwu is the Walter J. Sanders III-AMD Endowed Chair professor in Electrical and Computer Engineering in the Coordinated Science Laboratory at the University of Illinois at Urbana-Champaign. His research is on compiler design, computer architecture, computer microarchitecture, and parallel processing. He is a principal investigator for the petascale Blue Waters supercomputer, is co-director of the Universal Parallel Computing Research Center (UPCRC), and is principal investigator for the first NVIDIA CUDA Center of Excellence at UIUC. At the Illinois Coordinated Science Lab, Hwu leads the IMPACT Research Group and is director of the OpenIMPACT project – which has delivered new compiler and computer architecture technologies to the computer industry since 1987. From 1997 to 1999, Hwu served as the chairman of the Computer Engineering Program at Illinois. Since 2009, Hwu has served as chief technology officer at MulticoreWare Inc., leading the development of compiler tools for heterogeneous platforms. The OpenCL compilers developed by his team at MulticoreWare are based on the LLVM framework and have been deployed by leading semiconductor companies. In 2020, Hwu retired after serving 33 years in University of Illinois at Urbana-Champaign. Currently, Hwu is a Senior Distinguished Research Scientist at Nvidia Research and Emeritus Professor at University of Illinois at Urbana-Champaign.

Biography
Dr. Hwu's completed in 1987 a PhD at the University of California, Berkeley, under Yale Patt. Their CPU microarchitecture projects, HPS and HPSm, 
were the predecessors of the form of out-of-order execution that became commercially successful with the Intel P6. For his contributions to the areas of compiler optimization and computer architecture, he received the 1993 Eta Kappa Nu Outstanding Young Electrical Engineer Award, the 1994 Xerox Award for Faculty Research, the 1994 University Scholar Award of the University of Illinois, the 1997 Eta Kappa Nu Holmes MacDonald Outstanding Teaching Award, the 1998 ACM SigArch Maurice Wilkes Award, the 1999 ACM Grace Murray Hopper Award, the 2001 Tau Beta Pi Daniel C. Drucker Eminent Faculty Award. He served as the Franklin Woeltge Distinguished Professor of Electrical and Computer Engineering from 2000 to 2004. He is a fellow of IEEE and ACM.

Current Research Affiliations
 Wen-mei Hwu NVIDIA Research
 IBM-Illinois Center for Cognitive Computing Systems Research
 Blue Waters Project at the National Center for Supercomputing Applications (NCSA)
 IMPACT Research Group at the Coordinated Science Lab
 Concurrent Theme for the Gigascale Systems Research Center
 CUDA Center of Excellence at Illinois

See also
 Wen-mei Hwu's Homepage
 Parallel Computing Research at Illinois: The UPCRC Agenda
 Parallel@Illinois
 Electrical and Computing Engineering at Illinois
 First Virtual School on Computational Science and Engineering: GPUs and Multicores - led by Wen-mei Hwu and David Kirk (Summer 2008)
 University of Illinois NVIDIA CUDA Course taught by Wen-mei Hwu and David Kirk (9 March 2007)
 Wen-mei Hwu: Chief Technology Officer, MulticoreWare Inc.

References

American computer scientists
American people of Chinese descent
American people of Taiwanese descent
Fellow Members of the IEEE
Fellows of the Association for Computing Machinery
Grace Murray Hopper Award laureates
Living people
Researchers in distributed computing
University of Illinois Urbana-Champaign faculty
Year of birth missing (living people)